Jasper Place High School is located in west end Edmonton, Alberta, Canada, and is part of the Edmonton Public School System.  It opened in 1961, originally part of the Town of Jasper Place school system, becoming a part of the Edmonton system when Jasper Place amalgamated with Edmonton in 1964.

In 2005, Maclean's Magazine chose Jasper Place High School as the top overall high school in all of Canada. In 2008, adding the methods used by the E.I.U's quality of life model, Jasper Place Ranked 1st in Canada, and 2nd in North America. In 2014, Strathcona High School was named 2nd best in Canada, but scored the same as Jasper Place, leading into a tie. However, on an international level, JP fared better than Scona and ranked as the #1 school in North America due to the I.B program. In comparison, Strathcona tailed at #4.

Jasper Place athletic teams are called the "Rebels".

Programs of study

Jasper Place High School offers a wide variety of programs and courses. The most notable of these are the full and partial International Baccalaureate (IB) and Advanced Placement (AP) programs, as well as general Alberta curriculum studies. Jasper Place is the only Edmonton Public High School to offer both IB and AP. Jasper Place is also the only Edmonton school to offer Film Studies IB in addition to its many other IB courses. The school also has the largest offering of CTS courses in Edmonton and has developed a major focus on computers, having teamed up with NAIT, the University of Alberta, and Grant MacEwan in order to allow students to complete their high school courses and receive credit for introductory courses at these institutions.

Beginning in the 2008/2009 school year, students were able to take an additional daily class known as "Block Zero" beginning before school begins, from 8:05 to 8:53 (as of the 2022-2023 school year). This makes it a shorter block then regular classes (48 minutes compared to 75 minutes). Courses offered include extra AP or IB science classes needed to get the full number of hours needed for the AP/IB Science courses, as well as extra physical education.

Beginning in the 2013–2014 school year, the school began offering Alternative Learning Opportunity (ALO) Days. The format of the days has varied depending on the year, as well as the semester. In the first semester that it was offered in, students could pick from a variety of courses that either lasted 1, 2 or 3 days (or a combination of courses so that they had 3 days worth of activities) that were spread out over the semester. This was changed in semester two of the same year to instead have two continuous days where the blocks were each 3 hours (all morning or all afternoon), in which students would go to their first and third block classes on the first day, and their second and fourth block classes on the second. In the 2014–2015 school year, the number of ALO days was increased to 5 a semester, and the format was again changed, to having students pick either one block, two blocks or all day sessions. The ALO Days have had controversy however, including from an Edmonton Journal columnist (who later had to apologize to the school), and have been marked with low attendance throughout.

Fine arts

Art

Art and Honours Art courses are also offered at Jasper Place High School. Student artwork is displayed throughout the school.

Drama

Jasper Place High School offers regular Drama courses, but also offers Advanced Acting and Technical Theatre extracurricular classes. It is recommended that these extracurricular courses are taken in conjunction with Drama. The students also participate in the One Act Play Festival, direct one act plays, and participate in Improv.

School productions

Jasper Place High School's Masquerade Theatre sees two mainstage productions every year. However, 2008 was the school's first year performing a collective, Shadowed, a play written and performed by the entire cast and crew in addition to one main stage production.
2005/2006 – Twelfth Night, While The Lights Were Out
2006/2007 – Antigone, The Miss Firecracker Contest
2007/2008 – Our Town, Shadowed
2008/2009 – Much Ado About Nothing, Done to Death
2009/2010 – Scapino!, Twelve Angry Men
2010/2011 – Oliver Twist
2011/2012 – The Crucible
2012/2013 – A Midsummer Night's Dream
2013/2014 – Daisy Pulls It Off
2014/2015 – Macbeth
2015/2016 – Our Town
2016/2017 – Girls Like That (play)
2017/2018 - Blue Stockings
2018/2019 - The Crucible
2019/2020 - The Curious Incident of the Dog in the Nighttime

Music

Students are offered Choir, Band, and Guitar, and introduced a Music Technology course during the 2008/2009 school year in which song-writing, composition, and technical music development is taught. Optional music clubs include Jazz Band, Glee Club and Drumline.

Trades
Jasper Place High School offers a wide range of trades, including culinary, cosmetology, welding, automotive class, aesthetics, carpentry and more.

Athletics
The Athletics program at Jasper Place has a multitude of options, including:
 Badminton
 Basketball
 Cheer and Pom
 Cross Country Running
 Curling
 Canadian Football
 Golf
 Handball
 Indoor Soccer and Outdoor Soccer
 Rowing
 Rugby
 Volleyball - Men's Provincial Champions 2014 and 2015
 Wrestling

Rebels Early Bird Basketball Tournament
Jasper Place holds an annual tournament called the REB International Basketball Tournament, regularly hosting high-school level teams from across the globe, such as China, Australia, and the US. The REB tournament began in 1982 with only sixteen teams competing. Now one of the largest international high school basketball tournaments in North America, the 2007 REB tournament saw 38 teams.

In 2015, the REB Basketball Tournament had its 34th tournament.

Fitness center
The Jasper Place Fitness Center is located near the CTS wing of the school, and is open from 9:00 am – 12:10 pm, and 1:15 pm – 5:00 pm. It is also available to female students before school as a part of a special women's fitness group. The Fitness Center is fully stocked with exercise equipment for virtually all needs.

Clubs

Jasper Place clubs change every year, depending on student's interests. But some of the most common choices include:
 Key Club
 Student Leadership
 Anime Club
 Concert Choir
 Chess Club
 Drumline
 Spanish Club
 Ski Club
 Performing Arts
 Grad Council
 Yearbook Club
 Writing Club
 Interact
 Cappies
 Book Club
Mathletes
Future Business Leaders Club
Astronomy Club
Michael Arsenault Club

Computer technology
Jasper Place High School places a great deal of focus on computer technology. The school offers a variety of courses such as Business Technology, Computer Science, Design Studies, and Hypermedia Technology. One ever-popular aspect of the Computer Technology courses is the instruction in Robotics design and creation.

Jasper Place's Computer Technology courses are designed to help a student's transition into post-secondary schooling, and the school has entered into partnerships with NAIT, the University of Alberta, and Grant MacEwan College to allow students to gain credit for high-school coursework.

They also have a TV show and Radio Station, JPTV and JPR (Jasper Place Radio) respectively. As of the second semester of the 2021/2022 school year, the TV show runs during the second period on Tuesday and Thursday, and the radio station runs at various times throughout the day.

Accomplishments

Statistics

In 2005, Jasper Place High School was chosen as the top overall high school in all of Canada by Maclean's Magazine.

Jasper Place has a 98.7% course completion rate, 93.2% of students meet the acceptable standard in diploma courses, and 1 in 4 students meet the standard of excellence in diploma courses.

Notable alumni
Bryan Barnett – Track & Field, 100/200m Canadian champion, Olympian 
Quanteisha Benjamin – Singer
Mike Comrie – NHL player
Thomas Dang – MLA
Adam Gregory – Country music singer 
Kelly Hrudey – CBC Hockey Night in Canada commentator, former NHL goalie
Daryl Katz  – Chairman and chief executive officer of The Katz Group
Eric Allan Kramer – Actor
Pierre Lueders – Olympic Bobsled, Gold (Nagano 1998), Silver (Turin 2006), World Champion 2004 & 2005 
Kier Maitland – Freestyle distance swimmer
Alan May - NHL player, NBC Sports analyst
Ryan McCourt – Artist
Bill Stevenson – CFL, 7 Grey Cups with the Edmonton Elks

References

 The JP Students Handbook, 2012 Edition
 Why Choose JP? handbook, 2012 Edition

External links
Jasper Place High School

High schools in Edmonton
International Baccalaureate schools in Alberta
Educational institutions in Canada with year of establishment missing